McVey is an Irish surname originating in the province of Connacht. It's more common in Ulster today. Notable people with the surname include:

 Alex McVey, American fine artist and illustrator
 Cal McVey (1849 – 1926), American professional baseball player
 Cameron McVey (born 1957), English singer-songwriter and music producer
 Daniel McVey (1892 – 1972), Australian public servant
 Derek McVey (born 1968) Australian rugby league player
 Dominic McVey (born 1985), British entrepreneur
 Duncan McVey (died 2010), New Zealand footballer
 Esther McVey (born 1967), British Conservative Party politician
 George McVey (1865 – 1896), American major-league baseball player
 James McVey (born 1994), member of The Vamps
 Leza McVey (1907 – 1984) American studio potter
 Patrick McVey (1910 – 1973), American actor
 Robert McVey (born 1936), American ice hockey player
 Sam McVey (1884 – 1921), American heavyweight boxer
 Tyler McVey (1912 – 2003), American actor
 Walter Lewis McVey, Jr. (1922 – 2014), American Congressman
 William E. McVey (1885 – 1958), American Congressman
 William McVey (sculptor) (1905 – 1995), American sculptor

See also
 McVay
 McVea
 McVeigh
 Vey (disambiguation)

References